Abraham Lincoln "Sweetbread" Bailey (February 12, 1895 – September 27, 1939) was a Major League Baseball pitcher for the Chicago Cubs and Brooklyn Robins from 1919 to 1921. He also served in the military in 1917 during World War I.

He died at the age of 44 in his hometown of Joliet, Illinois of cancer of his pituitary gland, and is interred at Elmhurst Cemetery.

External links

1895 births
1939 deaths
Major League Baseball pitchers
Chicago Cubs players
Brooklyn Robins players
Baseball players from Illinois
Sportspeople from Joliet, Illinois
New Orleans Pelicans (baseball) players
Beaumont Exporters players